Leboe can refer to:

People
 Bert Leboe (1909–1980), Canadian politician in BC
 Justin Leboe, Canadian chef and businessman